Geitodoris bacalladoi is a species of sea slug or dorid nudibranch, a marine gastropod mollusk in the family Discodorididae.

Distribution
It is mainly found in Mediterranean seabed environments. and in the Atlantic Ocean off the Canary Islands. The type locality is type locality: Agua Dulce, Tenerife (28°02'N, 16°33'W, 6 m)

Description

Ecology

References

Discodorididae
Gastropods described in 1990